Čachtice is a village in Nové Mesto nad Váhom District in western Slovakia with a population of 4,010 (as of 2014).

The village is situated between the Danubian Lowland and the Little Carpathians. It is best known for the ruins of the nearby Čachtice Castle, home of Elizabeth Báthory. The castle stands on a hill featuring rare plants, and the area was declared a national nature reserve (Čachtický hradný vrch) for this reason.

History
Prehistoric settlements from the neolithic, eneolithic, Bronze Age, Hallstatt period, La Tène period, Roman periods and the early Slavic period have been found here.

The first written reference to the village dates from 1263. Čachtice has received the status of a town in 1392, but it was later degraded back to a village. In 1847 the parsonage was the meeting place of the first Slovak national and cultural society Tatrín, at which the definitive decision to use the central Slovak dialects as the basis for the new standard of the codified Slovak language was adopted.

Castle

The castle was built in the 13th century in order to protect a trade route to Moravia. The most famous owner was the Countess Elizabeth Báthory, 
whose bloody legends were based on rumors. There was national process against her. According to the alleged murders, the questioned witnesses answered that they just heard the stories by others. Elizabeth's four servants testified (under torture), and they were executed quickly. György Thurzó, and the soldiers found an alive "prey" girl in the castle, and there is no document that they asked her what had happened to her. There was no real confession against the Countess. Historians now agrees that the story was a discrediting, conceptual litigation. She was imprisoned in her own castle and died there in 1614. The castle was abandoned in 1708 and now lies in ruins. Recently, the castle has undergone minor reconstructions.

Genealogical resources

The records for genealogical research are available at the state archive "Statny Archiv in Bratislava, Slovakia"

 Roman Catholic church records (births/marriages/deaths): 1661-1921 (parish A)
 Lutheran church records (births/marriages/deaths): 1783-1922 (parish B)

See also
 List of municipalities and towns in Slovakia

References

External links
 
 Municipal website of Čachtice 
 Slovakia Cachtice (Bathory) Castle
 Surnames of living people in Cachtice

Villages and municipalities in Nové Mesto nad Váhom District